Ectoedemia nigrifasciata is a moth of the family Nepticulidae. It is endemic to the Canary Islands.

The larvae feed on Periploca laevigata. They mine the leaves of their host plant. At first, the larva lives in an oval gall in the underside of the leaf, bordering the midrib. Towards the end of its development it makes an elliptic, upper-surface blotch, starting from the gall. There are often several mines in a single gall. Pupation takes place outside of the mine.

External links
Fauna Europaea
bladmineerders.nl

References

Nepticulidae
Moths of Africa
Moths described in 1908